The Taney Seamounts are a range of five extinct underwater volcanoes located  west of San Francisco on the Pacific Plate. The seamounts were identified during the United States Geological Survey's scan of the Exclusive Economic Zone, conducted in the 1980s with the GLORIA sidescan sonar.

References

Seamount chains
Seamounts of the Pacific Ocean